The 2009 Southland Conference baseball tournament was held from May 20 through 23.  The top eight regular season finishers of the league's twelve teams met in the double-elimination tournament held at Whataburger Field in Corpus Christi, Texas.  The winner of the tournament, earned the conference's automatic bid to the 2009 NCAA Division I baseball tournament.

Seeding and format
The top eight finishers from the regular season were seeded one through eight.  They played a two bracket, double-elimination tournament, with the winner of each bracket meeting in a single championship final.

Results

All-Tournament Team
The following players were named to the All-Tournament Team.

References

Tournament
Southland Conference Baseball Tournament
Baseball in Texas
Southland Conference Baseball
Southland Conference baseball tournament